The Canton–Akron Indians are a defunct Minor League Baseball team. They played in the Eastern League at Thurman Munson Memorial Stadium in Canton, Ohio from 1989 to 1996. They were affiliated with the Cleveland Indians.

History
Prior to their eight-year stint as the Canton–Akron Indians, this franchise was known as the Lynn Sailors (from 1980 to 1983 serving as the Double-A affiliate of the Seattle Mariners and Pittsburgh Pirates), Vermont Reds (from 1984 to 1987 serving as the Double-A affiliate of the Cincinnati Reds), and Vermont Mariners (in 1988 serving as the Double-A affiliate of the Seattle Mariners).

After the stint as the Canton–Akron Indians, the franchise moved to nearby Akron, Ohio and became the Akron Aeros.

Notable players

1989

Beau Allred
Kevin Bearse
Albert Belle
Jim Bruske
Tom Kramer
Mark Lewis
Ever Magallanes
Tom Magrann
Greg McMichael
Charles Nagy
Troy Neel
Jeff Shaw
Cory Snyder
Tim Stoddard
Rick Surhoff
Dwight Taylor
Efraín Valdez
Turner Ward

1990

Albert Belle
Jim Bruske
Jerry Dipoto
Bruce Egloff
John Farrell
Jeff Fassero
Ed Hearn
Don Heinkel
Tom Kramer
Mark Lewis
Greg McMichael
Francisco Meléndez
Jeff Mutis
Charles Nagy
Ken Ramos
Rudy Seánez
Jim Tatum
Mike C. Walker
Robbie Wine

1991

Eric Bell
Mike Birkbeck
Jim Bruske
Craig Chamberlain
Tim Costo
Jerry Dipoto
Logan Easley
José Elías Escobar
Rick Horton
Reggie Jefferson
Garland Kiser
Tom Kramer
Jesse Levis
Carlos Martínez
Brian Meyer
Oscar Múñoz
Jeff Mutis
Ken Ramos
Rudy Seánez
Andrés Thomas
Jim Thome
Lee Tinsley
Mike C. Walker
Colby Ward
Kevin Wickander

1992

Paul Byrd
George Canale
Alan Embree
Brett Gideon
Brian Giles
José Hernández
Glenallen Hill
Garland Kiser
Luis Lopez
Dave Mlicki
Donell Nixon
Chad Ogea
Dave Otto
Eric Plunk
Ken Ramos
Joel Skinner
Kelly Stinnett
Jim Thome
Lee Tinsley
Bill Wertz

1993

Paul Abbott
Gerald Alexander
David Bell
Paul Byrd
Mike Dyer
Alan Embree
Brian Giles
José Hernández
Calvin Jones
Pat Lennon
Albie Lopez
Luis Lopez
Greg McCarthy
Dave Mlicki
Charles Nagy
Julio Peguero
Herbert Perry
Ted Power
Manny Ramirez
Roberto Rivera
Paul Shuey
Joel Skinner
Julián Tavárez
Rafael Valdez
Randy Veres

1994

Paul Byrd
Carlos Crawford
Alan Embree
Pep Harris
Damian Jackson
Greg McCarthy
Gino Minutelli
Matt Williams

1995

Sandy Alomar Jr.
José Cabrera
Darrin Chapin
Carlos Crawford
Roland de la Maza
Travis Driskill
Danny Graves
Pep Harris
Damian Jackson
Steve Kline
Mike Matthews
Alex Ramírez
Anthony Telford
Ricky Trlicek
Don Wakamatsu
Eric Yelding

1996

Bruce Aven
José Cabrera
Bartolo Colón
Roland de la Maza
Einar Díaz
Travis Driskill
Steve Kline
Mike Matthews
Erik Plantenberg
Alex Ramírez
Richie Sexson
Kevin Tolar
Enrique Wilson

See also
List of defunct Ohio sports teams

External links
 Team history

Defunct Eastern League (1938–present) teams
Sports in Canton, Ohio
Canton-Akron Indians
Cleveland Guardians minor league affiliates
Baseball teams established in 1989
Baseball teams disestablished in 1996
Professional baseball teams in Ohio
1989 establishments in Ohio
1996 disestablishments in Ohio
Defunct baseball teams in Ohio